Gerard Lavin (born 5 February 1974) is a former footballer who played as a right-back. He played in the English Football League for Watford, Millwall, Bristol City, Wycombe Wanderers and Northampton Town, before finishing his playing career at Southern League side Farnborough. Born in England, he also played for the  Scotland U21 national team.

Career
Born in the English town of Corby to Scottish parents, Lavin started his career as a schoolboy at Watford. He became an apprentice at the club upon leaving school, and signed professionally in May 1992. Over the next three years Lavin made 149 first team appearances, most of them at right back in place of injured club captain Nigel Gibbs. Lavin scored three goals during his time at Watford, including one after 13 seconds in a match against future club Millwall.

After Watford finished 7th in the First Division in 1994–95, Lavin was sold to Millwall for £750,000. Watford were relegated the following season. At Millwall Lavin made 87 appearances over four years, scoring once in the Football League Trophy against Brighton, before being leaving on a Bosman free transfer in 1999, and joining Bristol City. He made his début for City on 7 August 1999 against Reading, but was sent off for deliberately kicking the ball at Reading fans. The ball broke a Reading fan's wrist, and Lavin was later convicted of assault.

Lavin made a further 22 appearances for Bristol in 1999–2000, but struggled to make the first team the following season. He was loaned to Wycombe Wanderers, and in May 2001 joined Northampton Town. He played three times in the first team before breaking his leg against QPR. Over the next two seasons he struggled to recover from the leg break and was forced to retire at the age of 30.

References

General

1974 births
Living people
People from Corby
English people of Scottish descent
English footballers
Association football defenders
Scotland under-21 international footballers
English Football League players
Southern Football League players
Watford F.C. players
Millwall F.C. players
Bristol City F.C. players
Wycombe Wanderers F.C. players
Northampton Town F.C. players